DZOK (97.5 FM), broadcasting as 97.5 OKFM, is a radio station owned and operated by PBN Broadcasting Network. Its studios and transmitter are located at the 3rd Floor, Romero Bldg., Peñafrancia Ave., Naga, Camarines Sur.

References

External links
OKFM Naga FB Page

Radio stations in Naga, Camarines Sur
Radio stations established in 1995